Isaiah is a ghost town in Butte County, California, United States. Part of the Bidwell Tract of 1876, It still appeared on maps as of 1948. Isaiah began as a mining community and later was used as a watering station for steam powered trains. Because of the construction of Oroville Dam (1961), the railroad was re-directed. This led to the inhabitants eventually selling their property. It is now privately owned.

A post office operated at Isaiah from 1919 to 1943 and from 1947 to 1954.

References

External links

Former settlements in Butte County, California
Former populated places in California